The list of shipwrecks in May 1865 includes ships sunk, foundered, grounded, or otherwise lost during May 1865.

1 May

2 May

3 May

4 May

5 May

6 May

7 May

8 May

9 May

10 May

12 May

13 May

14 May

15 May

16 May

17 May

18 May

19 May

20 May

21 May

22 May

23 May

24 May

25 May

26 May

28 May

29 May

30 May

31 May

Unknown date

References

Notes

Bibliography
 Gaines, W. Craig, Encyclopedia of Civil War shipwrecks, Louisiana State University Press, 2008 , .
 Ingram, C. W. N., and Wheatley, P. O., (1936) Shipwrecks: New Zealand disasters 1795–1936. Dunedin, NZ: Dunedin Book Publishing Association.

1865-05
Maritime incidents in May 1865